Feeling Myself or Feelin' Myself may refer to:

 "Feeling Myself" (Nicki Minaj song), a 2014 song by Nicki Minaj
 "Feeling Myself", a song by Pusha T from Fear of God II: Let Us Pray, 2011
 "Feeling Myself", a song by Wolf Alice from Blue Weekend, 2021
 "Feelin' Myself" (Nipsey Hussle song), 2010
 "Feelin' Myself" (will.i.am song)", 2013